Season twenty-four of Dancing with the Stars premiered on March 20, 2017, on the ABC network.

On May 23, 2017, former NFL runningback Rashad Jennings and Emma Slater were crowned the champions, while former MLB catcher David Ross and Lindsay Arnold finished in second place, and Fifth Harmony singer Normani and Val Chmerkovskiy finished in third.

Cast

Couples
On February 21, 2017, Maksim Chmerkovskiy and Peta Murgatroyd were announced as the first two professionals returning this season. In the following days, Lindsay Arnold, Sharna Burgess, Witney Carson,  Artem Chigvintsev, Valentin Chmerkovskiy, Sasha Farber, Gleb Savchenko, and Emma Slater were all confirmed as professional dancers. In addition, Kym Herjavec (who last competed in season 20 and Keo Motsepe (who last competed in season 22) were confirmed to be returning as professional dancers. 

The full list of celebrities and pros was announced on Good Morning America on March 1, 2017.

Hosts and judges
Tom Bergeron and Erin Andrews returned as hosts, and Carrie Ann Inaba, Len Goodman, Julianne Hough, and Bruno Tonioli returned as judges. On April 24, former contestant Nick Carter joined the panel as a guest judge, filling in for Hough who was on tour. On May 1, choreographer Mandy Moore also filled in for Hough as a guest judge.

Dance troupe 
Season 24 troupe consisted of returning pros Hayley Erbert, Britt Stewart, Brittany Cherry and Alan Bersten, and new pros Artur Adamski and Brandon Armstrong.

Scoring charts

Notes

 : This was the lowest score of the week.
 : This was the highest score of the week.
 :  This couple finished in first place.
 :  This couple finished in second place.
 :  This couple finished in third place.
 :  This couple was eliminated.

Highest and lowest scoring performances
The best and worst performances in each dance according to the judges' 40-point scale are as follows.

Couples' highest and lowest scoring dances
Scores are based upon a potential 40-point maximum.

Weekly scores
Individual judges' scores in the charts below (given in parentheses) are listed in this order from left to right: Carrie Ann Inaba, Len Goodman, Julianne Hough, Bruno Tonioli.

Week 1: First Dances/400th Episode Week
The couples danced the cha-cha-cha, quickstep, salsa, tango, or Viennese waltz. Couples are listed in the order they performed.

Week 2: First Elimination
The couples performed one unlearned dance. The foxtrot, jazz, jive, and paso doble were introduced. Couples are listed in the order they performed.

Due to an injury, Maksim Chmerkovskiy was unable to perform, so Heather Morris performed with Alan Bersten instead.

Week 3: Vegas Night
The couples performed one unlearned dance that paid tribute to the sights and sounds of Las Vegas. The Charleston and samba were introduced. Couples are listed in the order they performed.

For the second consecutive week, Heather Morris performed with Alan Bersten.

Week 4: Most Memorable Year Night
The couples performed one unlearned dance to celebrate the most memorable year of their lives. Contemporary, rumba, and waltz were introduced. Couples are listed in the order they performed.

For the third consecutive week, Heather Morris again danced with Alan Bersten.

Week 5: Disney Night
The couples performed one unlearned dance to a song from a Disney film. Couples are listed in the order they performed.

This was the fourth and final week that Heather Morris danced with Alan Bersten.

Week 6: Boy Bands vs. Girl Groups Night
Individual judges' scores in the chart below (given in parentheses) are listed in this order from left to right: Carrie Ann Inaba, Nick Carter, Len Goodman, Bruno Tonioli.

The couples performed one unlearned dance and a team dance to songs from popular boy bands and girl groups. The Argentine tango was introduced. Couples are listed in the order they performed.

Week 7: A Night at the Movies
Individual judges' scores in the chart below (given in parentheses) are listed in this order from left to right: Carrie Ann Inaba, Len Goodman, Mandy Moore, Bruno Tonioli.

The couples performed one unlearned dance, capturing the spirit of a specific movie genre. The couple with the highest score earned immunity from elimination, while the rest of the couples participated in dance-offs for extra points. Couples are listed in the order they performed. Two couples were eliminated at the end of the night.

For each dance-off, the couple with the highest remaining score picked the opponent against whom they wanted to dance; the chosen opponent was allowed to pick the dance style (cha-cha-cha, jive, or rumba). The winner of each dance-off earned two points.

Week 8: Quarterfinals
The couples performed an unlearned dance to a song chosen by the pro to complement their celebrity partner's personality. Each couple also performed a trio dance involving an eliminated pro or a member of the troupe. Couples are listed in the order they performed.

Week 9: Semifinals
The couples performed a dance coached by one of the four judges, as well as one unlearned dance. Couples are listed in the order they performed.

Week 10: Finals
On the first night, the couples performed a redemption dance and a freestyle. On the second night, the couples danced a fusion dance of two previously learned dance styles. Couples are listed in the order they performed.

Night 1

Night 2

Dance chart
The celebrities and professional partners danced one of these routines for each corresponding week:
 Week 1 (First Dances/400th Episode Week): One unlearned dance
 Week 2 (First Elimination): One unlearned dance
 Week 3 (Vegas Night): One unlearned dance
 Week 4 (Most Memorable Year Night): One unlearned dance
 Week 5 (Disney Night): One unlearned dance
 Week 6 (Boy Bands vs. Girl Groups Night): One unlearned dance & team dance
 Week 7 (A Night at the Movies): One unlearned dance & dance-off
 Week 8 (Quarterfinals): One unlearned dance & trio dance
 Week 9 (Semifinals): Judges' challenge & one unlearned dance
 Week 10 (Finals, Night 1): Redemption dance & freestyle
 Week 10 (Finals, Night 2): Fusion dance

Notes

 :  This was the highest scoring dance of the week.
 :  This was the lowest scoring dance of the week.
 :  This couple gained bonus points for winning this dance-off.
 :  This couple gained no bonus points for losing this dance-off.
 :  This couple earned immunity and did not have to compete in the dance-off.
 :  This couple danced, but received no scores.

Ratings

References

External links

Dancing with the Stars (American TV series)
2017 American television seasons